Home Care is a 2015 Czech-Slovak drama film directed by Slávek Horák. The film was selected as the Czech entry for the Best Foreign Language Film at the 88th Academy Awards but it was not nominated.

Plot
Vlasta is a home nurse who selflessly lives in the countryside in South Moravia for her patients; her husband; and her daughter, Lada. One day, their lives drastically changed when Vlasta becomes sick, and help from outside is needed. Through the daughter of one of her patients, she tries alternative medicine, much to the dismay of her husband, who has little confidence in it.

Cast
 Alena Mihulová as Vlasta
 Bolek Polívka as Láďa
 Tatiana Vilhelmová as Hanácková
 Zuzana Krónerová as Miriam
 Sara Venclovská as Marcela
 Eva Matalová as Zelíková
 Marián Mitaš as Young doctor

Awards and accolades
The film received the Cercle D'or award for Best Movie in the International competition at the Festival Cinéma du monde de Sherbrooke. The jury also gave Mihulová a special prize for Outstanding Performance.

Mihulová received the Czech Lion award for Best Actress in a Starring Role. The film had eight other nominations for the Czech Lions (the country's top film and television awards).

At the Karlovy Vary International Film Festival, Mihulová was conferred the award for best actress.

She also won the Fipresci Prize for Best Actress of the Year in a Foreign Language Film at the Palm Springs International Film Festival.

See also
 List of submissions to the 88th Academy Awards for Best Foreign Language Film
 List of Czech submissions for the Academy Award for Best Foreign Language Film

References

External links
 
 
 Cineuropa

2015 films
2015 drama films
Czech drama films
2010s Czech-language films
Czech Lion Awards winners (films)
Czech Film Critics' Awards winners
2015 directorial debut films